Kevin Joseph Sweeney (born November 16, 1963) is a former American football quarterback in the National Football League (NFL) for the Dallas Cowboys. He played college football at Fresno State University.

Early years
Sweeney attended Bullard High School, where he was a standout quarterback. As a senior, he broke Pat Haden's state record for touchdown passes in a season with 35 and received Northern California offensive player of the year honors.

His older brother Jim was recruiting him for the University of Washington, while his father Jim Sweeney was doing the same for Fresno State University.

College career
Sweeney accepted a scholarship from Fresno State University to be coached by his father and replace at quarterback the graduated Jeff Tedford. He worked with Steve DeBerg, whom he credited with helping him most with his throwing motion.

He was a four-year starter, played in 46 contests and missed only one half of a game in his career, even playing as a senior with a left dislocated shoulder that required surgery at the end of the season.

As a sophomore, he passed for 3,259 yards and 20 touchdowns, leading the nation's highest scoring offense (39.1 points per game). The next year, he threw for 2,604 yards and 14 touchdowns, while helping his team finish as the only Division I unbeaten school (11-0-1). He also had a career long 95-yard touchdown pass against Oregon State University.

As a senior, he had the lowest interception percentage (2.37) among the top 25 rated passers and set a conference mark with a career-high 4 touchdown passes against New Mexico State University. He became the NCAA most prolific passer after breaking Doug Flutie's record for passing yards in a career (10,623 yards).
 He shared the NCAA mark for most games of 200 or more passing yards (31), had the conference's career records for touchdowns (66) and completions (781). His number 9 jersey was retired by the school.

College statistics
 1983: 166/334 for 2,359 yards with 16 TD vs 19 INT
 1984: 227/421 for 3,259 yards with 20 TD vs 13 INT
 1985: 177/295 for 2,604 yards with 14 TD vs 7 INT
 1986: 160/284 for 2,363 yards with 15 TD vs 9 INT

Professional career

Dallas Cowboys
Sweeney was selected by the Dallas Cowboys in the seventh round (180th overall) of the 1987 NFL Draft, after dropping because of his height. It was also a type of homecoming, as he was a ballboy at the Cowboys' Thousand Oaks training camp growing up. He couldn't pass Paul McDonald on the depth chart and was waived on September 7.

After the players went on a strike on the third week of the 1987 season, those games were canceled (reducing the 16 game season to 15) and the NFL decided that the games would be played with replacement players. Sweeney was signed to be a part of the Dallas Cowboys replacement team, that was given the mock name "Rhinestone Cowboys" by the media. He became the third ever rookie quarterback to start for the Cowboys, following Don Meredith (1960) and Roger Staubach (1969). He was a very popular player with the fans during those games; accounting for 4 touchdown passes, 20.8 yards per completion and 2 wins. His 77-yard touchdown pass to Cornell Burbage against the Philadelphia Eagles was the team's longest completion of the season.

When Danny White took over the team for the third replacement game against the Washington Redskins, the crowd started chanting "We Want Sweeney, We Want Sweeney" when the team didn't perform well in the eventual 13-7 loss. He was kept on the roster for the rest of the year.

On November 6, 1988, he started the second half and passed for three touchdowns against the New York Giants. The next game, he was given the opportunity to start against the Minnesota Vikings, but lost 43-3 after  completing just 10 of 28 passes for 93 yards, with 2 interceptions and 2 fumbles.

In 1989, with the arrival of new head coach Jimmy Johnson and with the team also intending to draft a quarterback, he was left unprotected in Plan B free agency.

San Francisco 49ers
In 1989, Sweeney signed with the San Francisco 49ers as a Plan B free agent. He was released before the start of the season.

Montreal Machine (WLAF)
In 1991, he signed with the Montreal Machine of the World League of American Football, where he was named the starter at quarterback, before being passed on the depth chart by Michael Proctor. He played in 10 games, making 24 completions out of 69 attempts for 219 yards, one touchdown and 3 interceptions.

Personal life
Sweeney is a senior vice president at Wells Fargo Bank.

References

External links
 
 Return of the Kid

1963 births
Living people
Sportspeople from Fresno, California
Players of American football from California
American football quarterbacks
Dallas Cowboys players
Fresno State Bulldogs football players
Montreal Machine players
National Football League replacement players